The Miami Beach Open was a golf tournament on the PGA Tour in the late 1920s and again in the 1950s. It was held at several different courses in the Miami Beach, Florida area.

Winners

^ 36-hole event

References

External links
Bayshore Golf Course - now called Miami Beach Golf Club
La Gorce Country Club
Normandy Shores Golf Club

Former PGA Tour events
Golf in Florida